SK Tirfing is a sports club in Skutskär in northern Uppland in Sweden. Established on 20 January 1923, the club won the Swedish national men's bandy championship in 1930. Between 1931 and 1942, the club played seven seasons in the Swedish top division. The club gave up bandy in 1981, and what remains is a women's team handball section.

History
In the first year of bandy league system in Sweden, 1930–31, Tirfing entered in Division 1 Norra together with
AIK, Hammarby IF, IF Vesta, IFK Rättvik, IK Sirius, Skutskärs IF, and Västerås SK and finished fourth.

Honours

Domestic
 Swedish Champions:
 Winners (1): 1930

References

External links
 Official website (team handball section)

1923 establishments in Sweden
Bandy clubs established in 1923
Defunct bandy clubs in Sweden
Swedish handball clubs